Carl (or Karl) Zimmermann (or Zimmerman) may refer to:

Military men
Carl Heinrich Zimmermann (1864–1949), German military officer
Karl Zimmermann (admiral), promoted to admiral in 1911 (List of admirals of Germany)

Sportspeople
Karl Zimmermann (sport shooter) (1894–1986), Swiss sports shooter
Carl Zimmerman (cricketer) (1898–1969), New Zealand cricketer

Television personalities
Carl Zimmermann (news anchor) (c. 1918–2014), American television journalist
Carl Zimmerman (producer) (born 1929), American producer and talent agent

Others
Karl Zimmermann (theologian) (1803–1877), German Protestant theologian
Carl Johann Christian Zimmermann (1831–1911), German architect and chief of works
Carl Zimmermann (politician) (born 1951), American politician from Florida